Kuthiala is one of the 51 Union councils of Abbottabad District in Khyber-Pakhtunkhwa province of Pakistan.

Subdivisions
 Gheley
 Gup
 Joghan Mar
 Kothiala
 Mukhdabi
 Nallah
 Paswal
 Salyut
 Sobra
 Tahli
 Todoo
 Salyot

Reason for name
A lot of kathas (Streams) flow from this valley So it is called Kuthiala.

Tribes
The main tribes inhabiting are:
 Tanoli
 Awan 
 Syed
 Rajputs
 Gujar

Important sites
 Mazar Gazi Badshah Gali Syedian.
 Mazar Shah Mian Chakully.
 Cave of Baba Shah Mian Chakully.
 Stone lion Sketch Soben Gali.
 Balyana Top Above 6500 feet Height.
 Toorn a stream near hall syedian

Facilities
Basic Facilities are available in Kuthiala i.e.
 Electricity
 Road
 High Schools
 Telephone
 Mobile Network
 Hospital
 Water Supply Scheme
 24 Hours Transport
 bank (HBL)
 post office

Hospitals
There is BHU in Kuthiala where an MBBS Doctor performer duty at the daytime. 24 hour private doctor available in Naka gali.

Education
In Kuthiala Education facilities are available i.e.
 Gov Boys High School
 Gov Girls High School 
 Fatima Jinnah public School
 Sir syed public School

Language & culture
In Kuthialia, Hindko, Urdu language is spoken.

References

Union councils of Abbottabad District

fr:Kuthiala